Martin Spinnangr (born 5 May 1987) is a Norwegian beach volleyball player. He was born in Farsund. He competed at the 2012 Summer Olympics in London with Tarjei Skarlund.  They reached the last 16, where they lost to the Latvian team of Plavins and Smedins.

References

Norwegian beach volleyball players
1987 births
Living people
People from Farsund
Beach volleyball players at the 2012 Summer Olympics
Olympic beach volleyball players of Norway
Sportspeople from Agder